The Murle are a Surmic ethnic group inhabiting the Pibor County and Boma area in Greater Pibor Administrative area,  South Sudan, as well as parts of southwestern Ethiopia. They have also been referred as Beir by the Dinka and as Jebe by the Luo and Nuer, among others. The Murle speak the Murle language, which is part of the Surmic language family. The language cluster includes some adjoining groups in Sudan, as well as some non-contiguous Surmic populations in southwestern Ethiopia.

Culture 
Murle in most cases practice a blend of animism and Christianity. Elders and witches often function as trouble fixers. But they are pastoralists in a country where localized and unpredictable shortages occur in rain, drinking water, bush fruits and cattle grass. This necessitates a partly nomadic lifestyle over large distances. As a result, in times of shortages they have frequently come into conflict with numerically larger groups, including the Dinka and Nuer. 

The Murle (like the Dinka and Nuer) have a tradition in which men can only marry when they pay a bride wealth of several dozens of cows. Education and jobs are almost absent and there are very few possibilities to earn money by producing for domestic or foreign markets. As a result, the only way to acquire cows for marriage, quicker than through breeding them, is by stealing. With roads absent and normal policing almost impossible in a vast territory, Murle, Dinka and Nuer raid each other equally, unlike the more widespread notion by the Dinka and Nuer in the Government that only the Murle are the offenders.[no cite, and the contrary has been held true by at least one anthropologist who has studied the Murle]

The Murle have a historical tradition of migrating over the years in a clockwise direction around Lake Turkana (Arensen 1983). In the 1930s, they negotiated small pockets of 'homeland' in Pibor, where they are always allowed to graze their cattle and grow crops, even when in conflict with neighbors. This homeland is far too small for their survival, so they have a common interest in maintaining peace with Dinka and Nuer so that they can graze their cattle over wider areas. But the small size of their homeland and the near absence of police protection make them very vulnerable when conflicts do occur. When doubts arise that there will be peace and sufficient water and grazing rights, survival instincts align with 'bride hunger', sometimes driving the young men into risky cattle rustling adventures against their larger neighbors.

In the north-south war since, the Murle were mainly underrepresented and neglected by the SPLA. They sought protection by forming an armed group to protect themselves from the former rebel SPLA and the Northern Sudanese Militias.

Massacres

In most South-Sudanese cattle cultures, the bride-wealth system, and illegal taxing by some unscrupulous local leaders stimulates young men to find excuses to steal cows from their own cousins. Local leaders then sometimes try to quell or prevent intra-tribal fighting, by directing that aggression outward, to other tribes. Also, Murle are feared and seen by surrounding larger tribes as having strong magical powers, and therefore they are often blamed for outbreak of diseases, theft and arson. 

With the country still awash with machine guns from the north-south war, 'cattle rustling' quickly runs out of control, killing dozens or hundreds of people in tit for tat escalations. Many Nuer reason that Murle are the grand children of immigrants with much less rights to use land and graze cattle. So Murle cattle, argue some Nuer, were raised on stolen grass, so most of their cattle actually belong to the Nuer. Many Murle elders argue that often if the Dinka and Nuer are facing hunger or drought, they sell their children to the Murle in exchange for cattle, then later report to the authorities that their children have been kidnapped by the Murle.

In December 2011, about 6,000 Nuer Youths Army marched on the remote town of Pibor in Jonglei state, home to the rival Murle people, burning homes and looting facilities after overtaking a small South Sudan Army unit. The Lou-Nuer blame the Murle for cattle raiding and have vowed to wipe out the entire Murle Tribe on the face of the Earth. An estimated 3,000 people were killed, mainly children, women and the elderly. More than 1,000 people were killed in ethnic clashes within South Sudan in 2012, with Jonglei being one of the states worst affected by the violence. Thousands more civilians have been displaced from their homes.

Along South Sudan's border with Ethiopia, a rebellion is smouldering among the Murle, with civilians caught in the conflict. Civilians alleging torture by the Sudan People's Liberation Army (SPLA) claim fingernails being torn out, burning plastic bags dripped on children to make their parents hand over weapons and the villages of Laor and the Tanyang people burned alive in their huts because rebels were suspected of spending the night in the village.

On August 18, 2011, to retaliate and retrieve cattle stolen from previous conflict, several young Murle sacked and burned the air strip village of Pierri and a dozen surrounding hamlets, killing over a hundred people, abducting dozens or hundreds of children and stealing up to tens of thousands of cattle. One explanation might also be the drought: Pierri has one of the very few functioning dry season drinking water wells, often with thousands of people queuing for its water. Nuer have often excluded Murle from using this water.

Because of the Dinka and Nuer domination in the South Sudan government and as well as in the State level, most problems are blamed on Murle; therefore it is difficult for journalists and researchers to check any claims against the Murle.

Some conflicts could be prevented by sinking more wells. Also, a national conference on drinking water, land use rights and land redistribution, might help, if Murle survival needs and all their arguments are taken seriously.

State intervention in bride wealth culture (moving it away from virtual slave trade to an exchange of intentions and nominal tokens) and strong state action against illegal taxation by local leaders in Nuer, Dinka and Murle society is also needed.

Also, South Sudan, with its enormous agricultural potential during the rainy season, needs to be connected to regional and world markets, so that through agriculture and cattle breeding, the economy can be based on something else than tit for tat theft.

Footnotes

References
Arensen, Jonathan E. 1982. Murle grammar. Occasional Papers in the Study of Sudanese Languages, 2. Juba: Summer Institute of Linguistics and University of Juba.
Arensen, Jonathan E. 1983. Sticks and straw: Comparative house forms in southern Sudan and northern Kenya. International Museum of Cultures Publication, 13. Dallas: International Museum of Cultures.
Arensen, Jonathan E. 1991. Aspects of language and society among the Murle of Sudan. D.Phil. thesis. Wolfson College, Oxford University.
Arensen, Jonathan E. 1992. Mice are men: Language and society among the Murle of Sudan. International Museum of Cultures Publication, 27. Dallas: International Museum of Cultures.
Arensen, Jonathan E. 1998. Murle categorization. In Gerrit Dimmendaal and Marco Last (eds.), Surmic languages and cultures, 181-218. Nilo-Saharan, 13. Cologne: R. Köppe.
Lewis, B.A. 1972. The Murle: Red Chiefs and Black Commoners. Oxford University at the Clarendon Press.
Payne, Thomas. 2006. Explaining Language Structures. Cambridge: Cambridge University Press.

External links
 Ethnologue
 Gurtong Peace Project

Ethnic groups in South Sudan
Ethnic groups in Ethiopia